In neuroanatomy, the optic tract is a part of the visual system in the brain. It is a continuation of the optic nerve that relays information from the optic chiasm to the ipsilateral lateral geniculate nucleus (LGN), pretectal nuclei, and superior colliculus.

It is composed of two individual tracts, the left optic tract and the right optic tract, each of which conveys visual information exclusive to its respective contralateral half of the visual field. Each of these tracts is derived from a combination of temporal and nasal retinal fibers from each eye that corresponds to one half of the visual field. In more specific terms, the optic tract contains fibers from the ipsilateral temporal hemiretina and contralateral nasal hemiretina.

Visual system
The optic tract carries retinal information relating to the whole visual field. Specifically, the left optic tract corresponds to the right visual field, while the right optic tract corresponds to the left visual field. To form the right visual field, temporal retinal fibers from the left eye and nasal retinal fibers from the right eye form the left optic tract, and to form the left visual field, temporal retinal fibers from the right eye and nasal retinal fibers from the left eye form the right optic tract.

Autonomics
Several autonomic ocular motor responses are consensual. The optic tract is primarily responsible for relaying visual information to the LGN, but it is also peripherally responsible for transducing these bilateral autonomic reflexes, including the pupillary light reflex and pupillary dark reflex.

Pupillary light reflex
The pupillary light reflex is an autonomic reflex that controls pupil diameter to accommodate for increases in illumination as perceived by the retina. Higher light intensity causes pupil constriction, and the increase of light stimulation of one eye will cause pupillary constriction of both eyes. The neural circuitry of the pupillary light reflex includes the optic tract which joins the optic nerve to the brachium of the superior colliculus.

Pupillary dark reflex
Similarly to the pupillary light reflex, the pupillary dark reflex is an autonomic reflex that controls pupil diameter to accommodate for decreases in illumination as perceived by the retina. Lower light intensity causes pupil dilation, and the decrease of light stimulation of one eye will cause pupillary dilation of both eyes. Similarly, the neural circuitry of the pupillary dark reflex includes the optic tract which joins the optic nerve to the hypothalamus.

Damage and pathologies

Lesions
Lesions in the optic tract correspond to visual field loss on the left or right half of the vertical midline, also known as homonymous hemianopsia. A lesion in the left optic tract will cause right-sided homonymous hemianopsia, while a lesion in the right optic tract will cause left-sided homonymous hemianopsia. Stroke, congenital defects, tumors, infection, and surgery are all possible causes of optic tract damage. Peripheral prism expanders and vision restitution therapy are often employed in patients with visual field loss resultant of permanent optic tract damage.

Split-brain
In certain split-brain patients who have undergone a corpus callosotomy to treat severe epilepsy, the information from one optic tract does not get transmitted to both hemispheres. For instance, a split-brain patient shown an image in the left visual field will be unable to vocally name what has been seen as the speech-control center is in the left hemisphere of the brain.

Pupillary reflexes
Pupillary reflexes, particularly the pupillary light reflex, are a powerful diagnostic tool often employed in clinical and emergency medical practice. A lack of equal consensual pupillary constriction to a light stimulus, especially a Marcus Gunn pupil, can be indicative of optic nerve damage, brainstem death, or optic tract damage in between.

Additional images

References

Visual system
Cerebrum